Suetin is a surname. Notable people with the surname include:

 Alexey Suetin (1926–2001), Russian chess player
 Nikolai Suetin (1897–1954), Russian artist